Chak 124 NB or Chak No. 124 NB is a village in Sillanwali Tehsil of Sargodha District, Punjab, Pakistan.

References

Populated places in Sargodha District